Bazemont is a commune in the Yvelines department in Île-de-France, northern France. It is situated 18 km south east of the town of Mantes-la-Jolie.

Bazemont means "la montagne de Baso", Baso's Mountain.

Geography
The commune of Bazemont contains the following smaller geographical areas (lieux-dits):
Les chênes
Sainte Colombe et bois de Sainte Colombe
la Mare Plate
chapelle du Roncé
carrefour de la vallée
route à Mayeul
le château de Bisouter
Beulle
carrefour de la Cockejoie
l’orme Philippien (abords de Maule)
la vallée Boule
la Malmaison
la Roise
la Vallée Rogère
le Déluge
le Poirier à Cheval
les Petites Aunes
les Vingt Arpents
les Grands Jardins
la Pie

See also
Communes of the Yvelines department

References

Communes of Yvelines